Petar Zehtinski (born 15 September 1955) is a former Bulgarian footballer and manager who played as a midfielder.

Career
A skillful free kick taker and a talented passer, Zehtinski spent more than a decade with Botev Plovdiv, while also having two spells with Arda from Kardzhali and one season with Omonia Nicosia in Cyprus. On 7 November 1984, Zehtinski captained the "canaries" from Plovdiv in their 2:0 second leg victory over German powerhouse Bayern Munich in a 1/8 final of the European Cup Winners' Cup. Botev Plovdiv were eventually eliminated after an aggregate score of 3:4. His nickname is Zico. Between 1996 and 1998, he was assistant manager of CSKA Sofia and also had a short stint as head coach in 1998. Beyond his club-related pursuits, Zehtinski has served as assistant manager of Bulgaria.

Honours
Master of Sports - since 1981

Best footballer of Plovdiv - 1983, 1984, 1989

References

External links

1955 births
Living people
Bulgarian footballers
Bulgaria under-21 international footballers
Bulgaria international footballers
FC Arda Kardzhali players
Botev Plovdiv players
AC Omonia players
First Professional Football League (Bulgaria) players
Cypriot First Division players
Bulgarian expatriate footballers
Expatriate footballers in Cyprus
Association football midfielders
Bulgarian football managers
PFC CSKA Sofia managers
Footballers from Plovdiv